The 27th Congress of the Communist Party of the Soviet Union was held from 25 February to 6 March 1986 in Moscow. This was the first congress presided over by Mikhail Gorbachev as General Secretary of the Central Committee of the CPSU. In accordance with the pattern set 20 years earlier by Leonid Brezhnev, the congress occurred five years after the previous CPSU Congress.  Much had changed in those five years.  Key figures of Soviet politics, Mikhail Suslov, Leonid Brezhnev, Yuri Andropov, Dmitriy Ustinov, and Konstantin Chernenko had died, and Mikhail Gorbachev had become General Secretary of the Party.  For this reason the congress was widely anticipated, both at home and abroad, as an indicator of Gorbachev's new policies and directions.  The congress was attended by 4993 delegates. It elected the 27th Central Committee.

The agenda of the congress:
 CC CPSU Report and the Party objectives (Given by Mikhail Gorbachev)
 New Party Statute release
 Political report of CC CPSU
 CPSU Central Revisional Commission report
 Report About the economic and social development of the USSR on 1986-1990 and in 2000 perspective
 Elections of the central Party organs

This Congress became the penultimate in the history of the Communist Party of the Soviet Union.

External links
 Political Report of the CPSU Central Committee to the 27th Party Congress by Mikhail Gorbachev
 Guidelines for the Economic and Social Development of the USSR for 1986-1990 and for the Period Ending in 2000 by Nikolai Ryzhkov
 The Programme of the Communist Party of the Soviet Union. A New Edition. Adopted by the 27th Congress of the CPSU on March 1, 1986
 Rules of the Communist Party of the Soviet Union approved by the 27th Congress

Congress
Communist Party of the Soviet Union 27
Mikhail Gorbachev
Perestroika
1986 conferences
February 1986 events in Europe
March 1986 events in Europe